Albizia vaughanii is a species of plant in the family Fabaceae. It is found only in Mauritius. Its natural habitat is subtropical or tropical dry forests.

References

vaughanii
Endemic flora of Mauritius
Trees of Africa
Critically endangered plants
Taxonomy articles created by Polbot